Herzlich willkommen (English titles: Crossing Borders or Welcome Indeed!)  is a 1990 West German drama film directed by Hark Bohm. It was entered into the 40th Berlin International Film Festival.

Cast
 Uwe Bohm as Friedrich Dombrowski
 David Bohm as Fritz
 Barbara Auer as Elke Kramer
 Hark Bohm as Direktor Dr. Fischer
 Anna Thalbach as Iris
 Eva-Maria Hagen as Sekretärin
 Michael Gwisdek as Hausmeister
 Werner Abrolat as Pförtner
 Klaus Rathjens as Erzieher
 Heinz Hoenig as Iris' Father

References

External links

1990 films
1990 drama films
German drama films
West German films
1990s German-language films
Films directed by Hark Bohm
Films set in the 1950s
Films based on German novels
Films about educators
1990s German films